The North Shore Academy is a secondary school in Stockton-on-Tees, North East England. The school was opened in 2010, and replaced Blakeston School and Norton Comprehensive School. The main campus of the Academy was situated on the old Blakeston School site. The academy has now moved to a new site on Talbot Street, Stockton-on-Tees. The Academy name was changed from North Shore Health Academy to North Shore Academy in September 2012 reflecting the change of sponsors from NHS Stockton to the Northern Education Trust.

Discipline
Teachers and councillors raised concerns over high exclusion rates in Northern Education Trust schools, after 40.3% of North Shore Academy pupils were excluded at least once in 2017–2018 against a national average of 2.3%. This was the second highest rate in the country.

References

External links

Northern Education Trust schools
Educational institutions established in 2010
Academies in the Borough of Stockton-on-Tees
2010 establishments in England
Secondary schools in the Borough of Stockton-on-Tees
Stockton-on-Tees